Pure is the seventh album by The Golden Palominos, released on October 11, 1994, by Restless Records.

Track listing

Personnel 
Musicians
Lori Carson – vocals, acoustic guitar
Knox Chandler – guitar
Bootsy Collins – guitar
Anton Fier – drums, percussion, programming, production
Lydia Kavanagh – vocals
Amanda Kramer – keyboards
Bill Laswell – bass guitar
Nicky Skopelitis – guitar, twelve-string guitar

Production and additional personnel
Bruce Calder – recording
Rich Costey – recording
Oz Fritz – mixing, recording
Garry Rindfuss – recording
Matt Stein – mixing, recording
Masanari Tamai – photography
Howie Weinberg – mastering

References

External links 
 

1994 albums
The Golden Palominos albums
Restless Records albums
Albums produced by Anton Fier